Epistemic privilege or privileged access is the philosophical concept that certain knowledge, such as knowledge of one's own thoughts, can be apprehended  by a given person and not by others. This implies one has access to, and direct self-knowledge of, their own thoughts in such a way that others do not. The concept can also refer to the notion of having privileged, non-perspectival access to knowledge of things about reality or things beyond one's own mind. Epistemic privilege can be characterized in two ways:

 Positive characterization: privileged access comes through introspection.
 Negative characterization: knowledge derived from privileged access is not based upon evidences.

Analysis

The still prevailing traditional position argues each of us do in fact have privileged access to our own thoughts. Descartes is the paradigmatic proponent of such kind of view (even though "privileged access" is an anachronic label for his thesis):

For Descartes, we still have privileged access even in the doubt scenario. That is, for him we would retain self-knowledge even in those extreme situations in which we can't have knowledge about anything else.

Gilbert Ryle, on the other hand, maintains a diametrically opposed view. According to the behaviorism of Ryle, each of us knows our own thoughts in the same way we know other's thoughts. We only come to know the thoughts of others through their linguistic and bodily behaviors, and must do exactly the same in order to know our own thoughts. There is no privileged access. We only have access to what we think upon evidences supplied through our own actions.

References

Further reading

 Donald Davidson, 1987, Knowing one's own mind
 Descartes, René, 1641 (Latin) and 1647 (revised translation to French), Meditations on First Philosophy
 Descartes, René 1641, Principles of Philosophy
 Gilbert Ryle, 1966, "Self-Knowledge"
 Joseph Agassi, "Privileged Access", Inquiry, 12, 1969, 420–6. Reprinted in his Science in Flux, Boston Studies in the Philosophy of Science, Vol. 28, pp. 120–6.

Cognition
Conceptions of self
Concepts in epistemology
Concepts in the philosophy of mind
Doubt
Epistemology
Knowledge
Philosophy of mind
René Descartes